Sørvik or Sørvika is a village in Harstad Municipality in Troms og Finnmark county, Norway.

Its population (2001) is about 451.  The village includes the Sørvik Barne- og Ungdomsskole school which houses grades 5 through 10, the Sørvik barnehage kindergarten, and the Sørvik eldrehjem retirement home. Sørvik also has its own soccer team called SMIL (Sørvikmark Idrettslag).  There is also the Sandtorg Church, a grocery store, and a gas station.  In the churchyard are three British war graves.

Sørvik Rural Museum
There is also a rural/historical museum in boundary with the church and cemetery grounds, which is open every summer for visitors. The museum was founded in June 1953, and consists of several log buildings moved from various locations near Harstad.

The museum is a great opportunity to experience and view the average Norwegian home and lifestyle in the beginning of this century and earlier. The museum shows different log architecture since the 19th century and earlier, but also farming/fishing and everyday tools used in this period. Every museum event is normally advertised daily on signs by the road. There are also guides for tourist groups.

Vikevannet
Vikevannet is formed by various small brooks from nearby fens, but mainly from its main water source from Vollstadheia. The outgoing stream/river ends by the coast of Sørvik, also known as "Sørvikelva". This river was earlier populated by salmon and sea trout, but vanished because of the lack of continuous heavy water stream and earlier pollution. Vikevannet is a popular fishing destination for families or fishing enthusiasts from all around Harstad and other nearby areas. The main population of fish consists of trout, Arctic char, and some freshwater eel (Anguillidae) The surrounding properties are mainly owned by local farmers or other landed property. Vikevannet is also a very popular bird destination, and you can often see rather rare (in this area)  birds in this area including swan, black-throated loon, dipper, snipe, Eurasian curlew, Eurasian whimbrel, northern lapwing, and a variety of freshwater ducks and grebe birds.

Metal community
Sørvik is locally known as a "metal-community".  The heavy metal music movement is connected to the youth of the village.  There have been several well-known bands that have their roots in Sørvik.  Examples are Cat Eye (who will soon sign their first record with a German company), Flame Thrower (who won Norway's biggest amateur rock-contest Rock Mot Rus in 2005), Eternal Silence and Monkey Business.

References

Villages in Troms
Harstad
Populated places of Arctic Norway